The 1947–48 Boston University Terriers men's ice hockey season was the 26th season of play for the program but first under the oversight of the NCAA. The Terriers represent Boston University and were coached by Harry Cleverly, in his 3rd season.

Season
With the advent of a national tournament for this season, Boston University was one of the eastern teams favored to receive one of the two available bids. The Terriers didn't disappoint early when their offense, led by the top line of Dana Hixon, Irving Haynes and Jack Clopeck, showed up in force. BU scored in bunches and dominated their first four opponents. Their fifth game would be their biggest test, however, as Dartmouth was another prospective tournament hopeful, having won the last four eastern intercollegiate titles. Both teams were the measure of the other in the match and the two heavyweights fought to a draw in regulation. Unfortunately for the Terriers, Dartmouth pulled out the victory in overtime.

BU responded to their first loss of the season by going on a tear through eastern teams, winning their next four games by wide margins. After a week off the Terriers slowed down a bit but continued to pile up the victories and ran their record to 11–1. The team was hoping to break even with Dartmouth in the rematch, however, the second edition looked eerily similar to the first as the Indians took the match 5–6 in regulation. With the two losses to the greens and Dartmouth being the best team in the east, Boston University would need to win its conference championship if it had any hope of making the tournament.

To that point, the Terriers had been undefeated in league play and that trend continued as BU went on a third winning streak. Their final game of the regular season came against rival Boston College and was a rematch of an earlier BU victory. While the game would not affect BU's position in the standings, as they had already guaranteed themselves the NEIHL title, It could still impact the selection committee's decision on who would be the second eastern team. The Eagles, who were now playing with a full complement of players, stunned BU with a 2–9 drubbing and evened the season series. Fortunately, the Terriers had a chance to improve their standing because the NEIHL had instituted a conference tournament this season. BU was set against 3rd-place team Northeastern and were expecting the beat the Huskies for the third time that season, however, BU's defense faltered for the second straight game and the Terriers fell 5–8. The loss all but guaranteed that BU would not be selected for the tournament and the Terriers took their frustration out on Bowdoin in the consolation game, hammering the Polar Bears 18–4 and setting a new program record (since broken) for the most goals scored in one game.

Roster

Standings

Schedule and results

|-
!colspan=12 style=";" | Regular Season

|-
!colspan=12 style=";" | NEIHL Tournament

Scoring statistics

References

External links 

Boston University Terriers men's ice hockey seasons
Boston University
Boston University
Boston University
1940s in Boston